Johanna Wiberg (born 1983) is a Swedish handball player. She played for the club FCK Håndbold and for the Swedish national team. She participated at the 2008 Summer Olympics in China, where the Swedish team placed eighth, and the 2012 Summer Olympics, where the Swedish team placed eleventh.

References

External links

1983 births
Living people
Swedish female handball players
Handball players at the 2008 Summer Olympics
Handball players at the 2012 Summer Olympics
Olympic handball players of Sweden